The following is a list of episodes of Naked Science, an American documentary television series which premiered in 2004 on the National Geographic Channel.

Episode list

Season 1

Season 2

Season 3

Season 4

Season 5

Season 6

Season 7

Season 8

External links

Naked Science at Yidio.com
Naked Science at TVGuide.com
Naked Science at EpisodeWorld.com

Lists of American non-fiction television series episodes